Renato D. Alarcón is an emeritus professor of Psychiatry at the Mayo Clinic College of Medicine and works at Cayetano Heredia University. He was born in Arequipa, Peru and would go on to graduate from Cayetano Heredia University as a surgeon in 1966. Renato did Psychiatric postgraduate training at Johns Hopkins Hospital in 1970, where we received his Master's degree in Public health. Today, he is a professor of psychiatry at the University of Alabama at Birmingham. Alarcón serves as the Deputy Chief of the Department of Psychiatry at Emory University. He was also the director of the Mood Disorders Unit at the Mayo Psychiatry and Psychology Treatment Center. The American Psychiatric Association named him Distinguished Life Fellow. The American College of Psychiatrists named him Fellow of the American College of Psychiatry. He primarily studies cultural psychiatry, mood disorders, personality disorders, and post-traumatic stress disorder.

References 

Year of birth missing (living people)
Living people
Mayo Clinic people
Emory University School of Medicine faculty
Peruvian physicians
Peruvian psychiatrists
Peruvian public health doctors
Physicians of the Mayo Clinic
Johns Hopkins Hospital physicians

University of Alabama at Birmingham faculty